Annita Smith (born 25 May 1944) is a Dutch diver. She competed in the women's 10 metre platform event at the 1972 Summer Olympics.

References

1944 births
Living people
Dutch female divers
Olympic divers of the Netherlands
Divers at the 1972 Summer Olympics
Sportspeople from Groningen (city)
20th-century Dutch women
20th-century Dutch people